The 2003 Wyre Forest District Council election took place on 1 May 2003 to elect members of  Wyre Forest District Council in Worcestershire, England. One third of the council was up for election and the council stayed under no overall control.

After the election, the composition of the council was:
Health Concern 19
Conservative 9
Liberal 7
Labour 4
Liberal Democrats 2
Independent 1

Background
Before the election the council was composed of 21 Health Concern, 7 Conservative, 5 Labour, 5 Liberal, 2 Liberal Democrats and 2 independent councillors. 15 seats were up for election with Health Concern needing to gain one seat to win a majority but the other parties predicted they could make gains instead. The seats being defended in the election were 6 Health Concern, 3 Conservative, 3 Labour, 1 Liberal, 1 Liberal Democrat and 1 independent, which included 2 seats in Oldington and Foley Park ward where a Conservative councillor had stood down.

Election result
Health Concern suffered a net loss of 2 councillors after losing 3 seats and only gaining 1 in Oldington and Foley Park. Despite the losses Health Concern said that would continue as a minority administration on the council. The Conservatives strengthened their position as the main opposition on the council after increasing their number of seats to 9 including a shock gain from Labour in Wolverley. They put their gains down to a focus on "community issues" including crime, tax and health and disillusionment with Health Concern.

Meanwhile, Labour dropped to only holding 4 seats, their lowest number of seats on the council since the late 1970s and their joint lowest ever. Other changes included 2 gains for the Liberals in Broadwaters and Habberley and Blakebrook, while the Liberal Democrats lost 1 seat but gained another in Aggborough and Spennells.

Voter turnout in the election was down to below 31%, the lowest since 1998, with only 2 wards seeing a turnout of over 35%. This was attributed to the lack of strong issues during the campaign compared to previous elections where controversy over Kidderminster hospital and a planned incinerator increased interest.

Ward results

References

2003 English local elections
2003
2000s in Worcestershire